Congdon may refer to:

People
Amanda Congdon (born 1981), American ABC producer
Bevan Congdon (born 1938), former New Zealand cricketer 
Charles Congdon (1909–1965), American professional golfer
Charles Congdon (cricketer) (1891–1958), English cricketer
Chester Adgate Congdon (1853–1916), American lawyer and capitalist
Daniel Keen Congdon (1840–1907), Australian politician
David Congdon (born 1949), British former Conservative Party politician
Elisabeth Congdon (1894–1977), American millionaire
Frederick Tennyson Congdon (1858–1932), Canadian politician and lawyer
Gary Congdon (1937–1967), American racecar driver
George Congdon Gorham (1832–1909), Republican California politician and newspaper editor
Henry Martyn Congdon (1834–1922), American architect and designer
James Madison (Medal of Honor) (1842–1926), American soldier
Jeff Congdon (born 1943), American basketball player
Joseph Whipple Congdon (1834–1910), lawyer 
Lee Walter Congdon (born 1939), writer and historian
Lisa Congdon (born 1968), American author and illustrator
Shirley Congdon (born 1961), English educator and nurse
Thomas Congdon (1931–2008), American book editor
Tim Congdon (born 1951), British economist
William Congdon (1912–1998), New York artist Hiram Congdon House

Places
 Congdon Park (Duluth), a neighborhood in Duluth, Minnesota
 Congdon Street Baptist Church, an historically African American church in Providence, Rhode Island
 Congdon River, a river in Rhode Island 
 Hiram Congdon House, a historic home located at Putnam in Washington County, New York built about 1848

Other
SS Chester A. Congdon, a 1907 bulk steel freighter

See also
 Congdon's Shop, a hamlet in North Hill, Cornwall, GB